Queen's Head or Queen's Head Hotel may refer to

Inns and public houses in the United Kingdom
Old Queen's Head, Sheffield
Old Queens Head, Eynsham
Queen's Head Tavern
Queen's Head, Bramfield
Queen's Head, Brook Green
Queen's Head, Newton
Queen's Head, Pinner
Queen's Head, Stepney
Queen's Head, Stockwell
Queen's Head, Tolleshunt D'Arcy
Queen's Head, Uxbridge
Queens Head Hotel, Finchley
Queens Head Hotel, Sarn Bridge
Queens Head Inn, Icklesham
Queens Head Pub, Weybridge
Queens Head, Monmouth
The Old Queens Head
The Queen's Head, Sandridge
The Queens Head Hotel, Alnwick

Other
Queen's Head, Shropshire, a village; see List of United Kingdom locations: Q